Michael Joseph Keating (born January 21, 1957) is a Canadian former professional ice hockey left winger who played in one National Hockey League game for the New York Rangers during the 1977–78 NHL season. As a youth, he played in the 1968, 1969 and 1970 Quebec International Pee-Wee Hockey Tournaments with minor ice hockey team from Scarborough, Toronto.

See also
List of players who played only one game in the NHL

References

External links

1957 births
Living people
Canadian ice hockey left wingers
Dayton Gems players
Hamilton Fincups players
Ice hockey people from Toronto
New Haven Nighthawks players
New York Rangers draft picks
New York Rangers players
Toledo Goaldiggers players
Winnipeg Jets (WHA) draft picks